Nebria biseriata is a species of ground beetle in the Nebriinae subfamily that can be found in China and Amur Oblast of Russia.

References

biseriata
Beetles described in 1915
Beetles of Asia